The Women's road race at the 2014 Commonwealth Games, as part of the cycling programme, was held on 3 August 2014.

Results

References

Women's road race
2014 in women's road cycling
Road cycling at the Commonwealth Games